Low Self-Esteem Girl is a Canadian comedy-drama film, directed by Blaine Thurier and released in 2000. Shot on digital video for a budget of less than $10,000, the film stars Corrina Hammond as Lois, a naive woman with low self-esteem who gets drawn into unusual situations because of her overly trusting nature.

The film premiered in February 2000 at Blinding Light, an independent theatre in the Gastown district of Vancouver.

The film is noted for including musicians Carl Newman and Dan Bejar, Thurier's bandmates in The New Pornographers, and Jason Zumpano in supporting roles. The film's screening at the 2000 Toronto International Film Festival enabled The New Pornographers to play their first show in Toronto, several weeks in advance of the release of their debut album Mass Romantic.

The film received a nomination from the Vancouver Film Critics Circle for Best Off-Indie Film at the Vancouver Film Critics Circle Awards 2000. It subsequently screened at the 2001 SXSW festival, where it won the Jury Award for Best Narrative Feature.

References

External links
 

2000 films
2000 comedy-drama films
Canadian comedy-drama films
English-language Canadian films
Films shot in Vancouver
Films set in Vancouver
Films directed by Blaine Thurier
2000s English-language films
2000s Canadian films